Robert L. Kennedy (31 July 1880 – 22 April 1963) was an Irish field hockey player who competed in the 1908 Summer Olympics. In 1908 he represented the United Kingdom of Great Britain and Ireland as a member of the Irish national team. He won the silver medal with the team Ireland.

References

External links
 
Robert Kennedy's profile at Sports Reference.com

1880 births
1963 deaths
Members of the Ireland hockey team at the 1908 Summer Olympics
Irish male field hockey players
Medalists at the 1908 Summer Olympics
Olympic silver medallists for Great Britain
Ireland international men's field hockey players